The Roman Catholic Diocese of Pedena was a Catholic diocese located in the town of Pedena (modern day Pićan) in the central part of Istria, Croatia, 12 km southeast of Pazin and is now a Latin titular see.

History 
 Established in 557 as the Diocese of Pedena (Italian) / Petina (Latin) / Pican (Croat) / Petinen(sis) (Latin adjective), on territory split off from the Diocese of Trieste.
 Suppressed on 1788.03.08, its territory being reassigned to establish the Diocese of Gradisca. In 1969 it was restored as a Titular Episcopal See.

Episcopal ordinaries
(all Roman rite)
 
Suffragan Bishops of Pedena
incomplete : notably lacking the first centuries 
 Vigardo (? – 1200)
 Federico (1200 – 1203)
 Popone (1203 – 1231)
 Pietro di Montemarte (1239? – ?)
 Otone da Parenzo (1247 – 1253)
 Enrico (1254? – ?)
 Bernardo (1263? – ?)
 Viscardo (1267? – ?)
 Bernardo (1275? – 1284?)
 Ulrico (1295 – ?)
 Odorisio Bertrami, Dominican Order (O.P.) (1300 – death 1310)
 Enoch, Augustinians (O.E.S.A.) (1310 – ?)
 Demetrio (1324? – ?)
 Guglielmo (1339? – ?)
 Amanzio, Conventual Franciscans (O.F.M. ?Conv.) (1343.02.17 – ?)
 Stanislao da Cracovia, O.P. [the name suggests a Silesian] (1343.04.21 – ?)
 Demetrio dei Matafari (1345.02.23 – 1354.02.22), next Bishop of Nona (Nin, Croatia) (1354.02.22 – death 1387)
 Nicolò (1354.03.28 – ?)
 Lorenzo (1372.04.19 – ?)
 Andrea Bon (1394.02.16 – 1396.04.12), previously Bishop of Caorle (Italy) (1382 – 1394.02.16); later Bishop of La Canea (1396.04.12 – ?)
 Enrico de Wildenstein, Conventual? Friars Minor (O.F.M.) (1396.12.23 – ?)
 Paolo de Nostero, Augustinians (O.E.S.A.) (1409.08.23 – ?)
 Giovanni Straus, Conventual? Friars Minor (O.F.M.)  (1411.04.18 – ?)
 Gregorio di Carinzia, O.E.S.A. (1418.02.14 – ?)
 Nicolò (1430 – death 1434)
 Pietro Giustiniani, O.P. (1434.09.10 – 1457), next Bishop of Corfù (insular Greece) (1458 – 1458)
 uncanonical : Martino da Lubiana (1445 – 1447▼)
 Jakob Krainburg (1457.01.04 – ?)
 Konrad Arensteiner (1461.12.02 – death 1465)
 Michele (1465.06.07 – 1478)
 Michele (1465.06.07 – death 1478)
 Giorgio Maninger (1491.01.31 – ?)
 Ludovico Ruggeri (1501 – ?)
 Georg von Slatkonia (1513? – 1522.04.26), next Bishop of Wien (Vienna, Austria, now Metropolitan) (1513.08.12 – 1522.04.26)
 Nikolaus Creutzer, Conventual? Friars Minor (O.F.M.) (30 Jan 1523 - death 2 Oct 1525)
 Giovanni Barbo (16 April 1526 - death 16 Jan 1547)
 Zaccaria Giovanni Divanic (23 May 1550 - death 9 March 1562)
 Daniele Barboli, Order of Preachers (O.P.) (4 June 1563 - death 25 Feb 1570)
 Giorgio Rautgartler (Reitgherlet) (27 April 1573 - death 10 Dec 1600)
 Antonio Zara (13 May 1601 - death 13 Dec 1621)
 Pompeo Coronini (21 April 1625 - 27 Jan 1631), next Bishop of Roman Catholic Diocese of Trieste (Italy) (1631.01.27 – 1646)
 Gaspard Bobek (7 April 1631 - 1635 Died)
 Antonio Marenzi (born Italy) (17 August 1637 Confirmed - 10 Sep 1646), next Bishop of Roman Catholic Diocese of Trieste (Italy) ([1646.04.26] 1646.09.10 – 1662.10.20)
 Franz Maximilian Vaccano (born Italy) (1 March 1649 Confirmed - 12 March 1663), next Bishop of Roman Catholic Diocese of Trieste (Italy)  ([1662.11.06] 1663.03.12 – 1672.08.15) 
 Paul de Tauris-Jancic, Order of Friars Minor (O.F.M.) (13 Aug 1663 - death 1 Feb 1667); previously uncanonical Bishop of Srijem (Serbia) (1662.09.19 – 1663.08.13▼)
 Paul Budimir, O.F.M. (1 Oct 1668 - death 3 April 1670) 
 Andreas Daniel von Rauchnach (15 Dec 1670 - death 9 Dec 1686) 
 Johann Markus Rossetti (12 Dec 1689 - death 10 Nov 1691) 
 Peter Anton Gaus von Homberg (9 March 1693 - death 25 April 1716) 
 Georg Xaver Marotti (25 April 1716 - death 20 August 1740), succeeded as former Coadjutor Bishop of Pedena (? – 25 April 1716) 
 Bonifatius Cecchotti, Order of Friars Minor (O.F.M.) (3 July 1741 - death 1 May 1765) 
 Aldrago Antonio de Piccardi (born Italy) (1 Dec 1766 - 14 Feb 1785) Confirmed, next Bishop of Senj-Modruš (Croatia) ([1784.08.31] 1785.02.14 – death 1789.09.13).

Titular see 
The diocese was nominally restored in 1969 as Latin Titular bishopric of Pićan (Hrvatski) / Pedena (Italian) / Petina (Latin) / Petinen(sis) (Latin adjective).
 
It has had the following incumbents, of the fitting Episcopal (lowest) rank, with an archiepiscopal exception :
 ''Titular Archbishop: Josip Pavlišić (1969.08.20 – 1974.04.18) as Coadjutor Archbishop of Rijeka–Senj (Croatia) (1969.08.20 – 1974.04.18), later succeeding as Metropolitan Archbishop of Rijeka–Senj (1974.04.18 – retired 1990.01.05); previously Titular Bishop of Bruzus (1951.12.13 – 1969.08.20) as Auxiliary Bishop of Senj-Modruš (Croatia) (1951.12.13 – 1969.08.20); died 2005
 John Edward McCarthy (1979.01.23 – 1985.12.19) as Auxiliary Bishop of Galveston-Houston (Texas, USA) (1979.01.23 – 1985.12.19); later Bishop of Austin (Texas, USA) (1985.12.19 – retired 2001.01.02)
 Rafael Palmero Ramos (1987.11.24 – 1996.01.09) as Auxiliary Bishop of Toledo (Spain) (1987.11.24 – 1996.01.09); later Bishop of Palencia (Spain) (1996.01.09 – 2005.11.26), Bishop of Orihuela–Alicante (Spain) (2005.11.26 – retired 2012.07.27)
 Reinhard Marx (1996.07.23 – 2001.12.20) as Auxiliary Bishop of Archdiocese of Paderborn (Germany) (1996.07.23 – 2001.12.20); later Bishop of Trier (Germany) (2001.12.20 – 2007.11.30), Metropolitan Archbishop of München und Freising (Munich and Freising, Germany) (2007.11.30 – ...), Vice-President of Council of European Bishops’ Conferences (2009.03 – 2012.03.22), created Cardinal-Priest of S. Corbiniano (2010.11.20 [2011.06.05] – ...), President of Council of European Bishops’ Conferences (2012.03.22 – ...), Member of Council of Cardinals to assist in the governance of the Universal Church and to reform the Roman Curia (2013.04.13 – ...), Coordinator of Council for the Economy (2014.03.08 – ...), President of German Episcopal Conference (2014.03.12 – ...)
 Valentin Pozaić, Jesuit Order (S.J.) (2005.02.02 – ...), Auxiliary Bishop of Archdiocese of Zagreb (Croatia) (2005.02.02 – ...), no previous prelature.

See also 
 Catholic Church in Croatia
 List of Catholic dioceses in Croatia

References

Sources and external links 
 GCatholic - former and titular see - data for all sections

Former Roman Catholic dioceses in Croatia